Pietro Antonio Novelli (1729–1804) was an Italian painter and engraver.

Biography
Novelli trained with the Venetian painter Jacopo Amigoni. In 1768, he was accepted as a member of the Accademia di Belle Arti in Venice. Novelli produced altarpieces and frescoes throughout northern Italy. Some of his commissions came from Catherine the Great. He moved to Rome around 1779 where he remained for over 20 years. He later returned to Venice where he died in 1804. His memoirs were published posthumously in 1834.

Works

References

18th-century Italian painters
Italian male painters
19th-century Italian painters
Italian engravers
1729 births
1804 deaths
19th-century Italian male artists
18th-century Italian male artists